Ryan Campbell Maskelyne (born 25 January 1999) is a Papua New Guinean swimmer. He competed in the men's 200 metre breaststroke at the 2020 Summer Olympics.

References

External links
 

1999 births
Living people
People from Grafton, New South Wales
Sportsmen from New South Wales
Australian male swimmers
Papua New Guinean male swimmers
Male breaststroke swimmers
Olympic swimmers of Papua New Guinea
Swimmers at the 2020 Summer Olympics
Swimmers at the 2022 Commonwealth Games
Commonwealth Games competitors for Papua New Guinea